Raymond Scholey Barnard (16 April 1933 – 7 July 2017) was an English footballer who made 156 appearances in the Football League playing for Middlesbrough and Lincoln City. He then helped Grantham win the 1963–64 Midland League title, and finished his career with Lincoln Claytons. He played as a full back.

References

1933 births
2017 deaths
Footballers from Middlesbrough
English footballers
Association football defenders
Middlesbrough F.C. players
Lincoln City F.C. players
Grantham Town F.C. players
English Football League players
Midland Football League players